The 2018 Southeast Missouri State Redhawks football team represented Southeast Missouri State University as a member of the Ohio Valley Conference (OVC) during the 2018 NCAA Division I FCS football season. Led by fifth-year head coach Tom Matukewicz, the Redhawks compiled an overall record of 9–4 with a mark of 6–2 in conference play, placing second in the OVC. Southeast Missouri State received an at-large bid to the NCAA Division I Football Championship playoffs, where they defeated Stony Brook in the first round before losing to Weber State in the second round. The team played home games at Houck Stadium in Cape Girardeau, Missouri.

Previous season
The Redhawks finished the 2017 season 3–8, 3–5 in OVC play to finish in a tie for fifth place.

Preseason

OVC media poll
On July 20, 2018, the media covering the OVC released their preseason poll with the Redhawks predicted to finish in eighth place. On July 23, the OVC released their coaches poll with the Redhawks predicted to finish in seventh place.

Preseason All-OVC team
The Redhawks had thee players selected to the preseason all-OVC team. Running back Marquis Terry was also selected as the preseason offensive player of the year.

Offense

Marquis Terry – RB

Drew Forbes – T

Defense

Zach Hall – LB

Award watch lists

Schedule

Game summaries

at Arkansas State

Dayton

at Southern Illinois

at Eastern Kentucky

at Tennessee Tech

Austin Peay

Jacksonville State

at UT Martin

Tennessee State

at Murray State

Eastern Illinois

Stony Brook–NCAA Division I First Round

at Weber State–NCAA Division I Second Round

Ranking movements

Players drafted into the NFL

References

Southeast Missouri State
Southeast Missouri State Redhawks football seasons
Southeast Missouri State
Southeast Missouri State Redhawks football